Yucca flaccida, commonly called Adam's needle or weak-leaf yucca, is a species of flowering plant in the asparagus family (Asparagaceae). It is native to south-central and southeastern North America, from the lower Great Plains eastward to the Atlantic seaboard in Virginia, south through Florida and the Gulf states. Its natural habitat is in sandy open woodlands and fields. It is not considered to be threatened by the IUCN.

Description

The Latin specific epithet flaccida means "weak", "feeble", referring to the leaves which often fold under their own weight (the inner leaves may remain erect as they are supported by the outer ones).

Taxonomy
Some authorities regard Y. flaccida as a variety or form of Y. filamentosa, rather than as a separate species.

Populations in the South Central Region of the United States with unusually narrow leaves have been segregated as Y. louisianensis by some authorities. This entity is found in the states of Arkansas, Louisiana, Oklahoma, and Texas.

Ecology
A number of yucca moths lay their eggs upon Y. flaccida as a host plant, an example being Tegeticula intermedia.

Cultivation
It is cultivated and valued as an architectural plant. Numerous cultivars are available, some with variegated leaves, of which 'Golden Sword' and 'Ivory' have gained the Royal Horticultural Society's Award of Garden Merit.

References

flaccida
Flora of Eastern Canada
Plants described in 1819
Flora of the Eastern United States